Brian Woodman (born 10 October 1950) is  a former Australian rules footballer who played with South Melbourne in the Victorian Football League (VFL).

References

External links 
		
Brian Woodman's profile at Australianfootball.com

Living people
1950 births
Australian rules footballers from Victoria (Australia)
Sydney Swans players